Juan Luis de la Cerda, 6th Duke of Medinaceli, Grandee of Spain, (in full), (20 May 1569 – 24 November 1607) was a Spanish nobleman and Ambassador in Germanic countries.

He was born in Cogolludo, province of Guadalajara, the son of Don Juan de la Cerda, 5th Duke of Medinaceli, by first wife Donna Isabella d’Aragona, daughter of Don Antonio d’Aragona, 2nd Duke of Montalto. In 1580 he married Ana de la Cueva, daughter of Don Gabriel de la Cueva, 5th Duke of Alburquerque with whom he had one daughter. On 21 August 1606, he married for a second time, with Antonia de Toledo y Dávila, daughter of Don Gómez Dávila, 2nd Marquis of Velada and tutor of King Philip III of Spain, with whom he had one son. He died shortly afterwards.

Sources

1569 births
1607 deaths
Dukes of Medinaceli
Marquesses of Cogolludo
Counts of Puerto de Santa María
Juan 06
Knights of the Golden Fleece
Grandees of Spain